Dato' Normala binti Abdul Samad is a Malaysian politician. She is a member of the United Malays National Organisation (UMNO), a major component of the Barisan Nasional (BN) coalition. Normala was the former one-term Member of Parliament (2013-2018) for the Pasir Gudang constituency in the State of Johor.

Education background
Normala has a Diploma in Personnel Management (MIPM), Certificate in Training & Development, Certificate in Safety & Health Management (NIOSH), Professional Diploma in Safety & Health Management (consist), Bachelor of Business Management, Paramaount University of Technology and Master of Business Administration, Nottingham University.

Koperasi Seri Cempaka Pasir Gudang Bhd
Normala is the founder and current Chairman of Koperasi Seri Cempaka Pasir Gudang Bhd, which is a co-operation run by local women in Pasir Gudang. The main business run by these women are sewing, producing memorabilia, wedding apparel, cooking classes and catering.

Political affiliation
Normala is an UMNO Johor member. She was chosen by Barisan Nasional to contest in Pasir Gudang in the 13th Malaysian General Election.

Election results

See also
 Pasir Gudang (federal constituency)

References

1961 births
Living people
People from Johor
Malaysian people of Malay descent
Malaysian Muslims
United Malays National Organisation politicians
Members of the Dewan Rakyat
Women members of the Dewan Rakyat
Women in Johor politics